John Frail (23 July 1882 – 9 May 1915) was a Scottish professional footballer who played in the Scottish League for St Bernard's as an outside right.

Personal life 
Frail was married with two children. He served as a private in the Black Watch during the First World War and was killed in action in Pas-de-Calais on 9 May 1915. Frail is commemorated on the Le Touret Memorial.

Career statistics

References

British Army personnel of World War I
Association football outside forwards
British military personnel killed in World War I
1915 deaths
People from Burntisland
Scottish footballers
Lochgelly United F.C. players
Hibernian F.C. players
St Bernard's F.C. players
Scottish Football League players
Black Watch soldiers
1882 births